May God Bless America is a Canadian drama film, directed by Robert Morin and released in 2006. A critique of suburban values and lifestyles, the film stars Gildor Roy as Maurice Ménard, a police inspector in Laval, Quebec who is investigating a spate of murders of suspected sex offenders on September 11, 2001, in a community that is largely wrapped up in its own petty dramas with virtually everybody remaining oblivious to or unconcerned about the concurrent September 11 attacks in New York City.

The cast also includes Normand D'Amour, René-Daniel Dubois, Patrice Dussault, Gaston Lepage, Sylvie Léonard, Sylvain Marcel, Dominique Quesnel, Jean-Guy Bouchard and Benoît Rousseau.

Morin described the film as having been inspired in part by Albert Camus's novel The Stranger, with themes around the danger of individuality taken to extremes.

The film premiered on February 17, 2006 at the Rendez-vous du cinéma québécois.

Awards

Morin received a Prix Iris nomination for Best Screenplay at the 9th Jutra Awards in 2007.

References

External links

2006 films
Canadian drama films
Films shot in Quebec
Films set in Quebec
Films directed by Robert Morin
French-language Canadian films
2000s Canadian films